Molinos may refer to:

Places
 Molinos (TransMilenio), a railway station in Bogotá, Colombia
 Molinos, Chile, a village in the Arica and Parinacota Region
 Molinos, Jauja, seat of Molinos District, Peru
 Molinos, Salta, a village and rural municipality in Salta Province, northwestern Argentina
 Molinos, Teruel, a municipality in Maestrazgo comarca, province of Teruel, Aragon, Spain
 Molinos de Duero, a municipality in the province of Soria, Castile and León, Spain
 Molinos District, one of thirty-four districts of the province Jauja in Peru

People with the surname
 Edgar Molinos (born 1971), German weightlifter
 Jacques Molinos (1743–1831), French architect
 Miguel de Molinos (1628–1696), Spanish theologian and mystic

Other uses
 Molinos (album), an award-winning musical album by The Paperboys, or its title track and lead single
 Molinos Río de la Plata, an Argentine branded food products company

See also
 3 Molinos Resort, a professional cycling team based in Spain, founded and disbanded 2006
 Battle of Arroyo dos Molinos, fought 1811 during the Peninsular War in Spain
 Calzada de los Molinos, a municipality in the province of Palencia, Castile and León, Spain
 Rancho Rio de los Molinos, a Mexican land grant in present-day Tehama County, California
 San José de los Molinos District, one of fourteen districts of the province Ica in Peru
 San Pedro Molinos, a town and municipality in Oaxaca, south-western Mexico
 Los Molinos (disambiguation)
 Molino (disambiguation)
 Molinos de viento (disambiguation)